JS Hyūga (DDH-181) is the lead ship of the s of the Japan Maritime Self-Defense Force (JMSDF).

Development and design 

They are sometimes referred to as an aircraft carrier (helicopter carrier) from the ship's type of flight deck, but officially follows the predecessor Haruna-class destroyer, and as they are also a helicopter destroyer. In addition to advanced command and control capabilities, the ship itself has powerful anti-submarine and anti-aircraft combat capabilities due to the vertical launch system that can launch anti-submarine and anti-aircraft missiles and the newly developed C4ISTAR system. Instead, the function as an escort ship that can perform anti-submarine warfare with its own equipment is also emphasized.

They have the ability to operate a large number of helicopters at the same time due to its vast full deck and large hull volume. As a result, it has superior zone anti-submarine warfare capability than conventional helicopter-equipped destroyers, and can also handle transport helicopters and rescue helicopters. Respond to various missions such as support.

Since the hull size is larger than some conventional light aircraft carriers and amphibious assault ships, it may be compared with light aircraft carriers that operate STOVL aircraft such as the F-35 and Harrier, but the Ministry of Defense says The operation of the fixed-wing aircraft in the model has not been officially announced, and Yoji Koda, a former self-defense fleet commander, states that the ship is completely different in nature from the aircraft carrier.

Construction and career 
The ship was laid down on 11 May 2006 and launched on 23 August 2007 by IHI Marine United and commissioned into military service on 18 March 2009.

On 5 September 2009, medical verification was conducted at the port of Yokohama using helicopters from local governments, police, fire departments, the Ground Self-Defense Force, and the Japan Coast Guard. In October of the same year, she participated in the Maritime Self-Defense Force observing ceremony for the first time as a censored ship. She participated in the Annualex 21G Exercise (2009 Maritime Self-Defense Force Exercise), a bilateral exercise with the US Navy from 10 to 18 November of the same year. From 20 to 23 August 2010, in order to participate in Isewan Marine Festa 2010, and the icebreaker  were at Nagoya Port.

This ship delivered supplies and undertook disaster relief operations after the 2011 Tōhoku earthquake and tsunami.

She became the first Japanese vessel to have an American MV-22 Osprey land aboard the ship during exercise Dawn Blitz in San Diego, California on 14 June 2013. On 25 March 2015, the vessel's home port was transferred to Maizuru after being transferred to the 3rd Escort Corps of the 3rd Escort Corps by reorganization.

Hyūga was deployed in the Yatsushiro Sea to support the areas affected by the Kumamoto earthquake that occurred in April 2016, and served as a base for accumulating supplies and operating bases for helicopters. On 19 April, the US Marine Corps vertical takeoff and landing transport aircraft MV-22 Osprey, which supports transportation, landed on board, loaded with relief supplies such as water, food, and simple toilets, and airlifted to Minamiaso Village. Hyūga participated in the Japan-US-India joint training (MALABAR 2016) held in the waters east of Okinawa from 10 to 17 June 2016, and then sailed to Hawaii with  until 23 August. After that she participated in the US dispatch training (RIMPAC 2016) conducted in the sea and airspace around the west coast of the United States.  In June 2017, Hyūga alongside JS Ashigara joined the US Navy's Carrier Strike Group 1 and Carrier Strike Group 5 off the Korean Peninsula in response to increased tensions over North Korea's nuclear weapons program.

From the Ground Self-Defense Force, the Amphibious Rapid Deployment Brigade, the 1st Helicopter Corps, the Western Air Corps, etc. On 14 October of the same year, assuming a huge Nankai Trough earthquake, a Japan-US joint disaster prevention drill was held in Shirahama Town, Wakayama Prefecture. From 27 November to 5 December of the same year, Japan-US joint cruising training was conducted with the aircraft carrier  and several other ships in the sea and airspace from around the Bashi Channel to the south of the Kantō region.

Currently, she is assigned to the 3rd Escort Group, 3rd Escort Corps, and the home port is Maizuru.

Gallery

Notes

External links

Helicopter carriers
2007 ships
Hyūga-class helicopter destroyers
Ships built by IHI Corporation